Bringing Out the Best in People (How to Enjoy Helping Others Excel) is a book by Alan Loy McGinnis and published in 1985. It describes 12 rules that a leader should follow to motivate team members.

The book has been used frequently by people new to a supervisory or management position, with the main purpose being to help other people to lead and bring out the best in people. It was originally published in May 1985, and a 20th-anniversary edition was published in 2005.

Reviews

1985 non-fiction books